Behrman also known as "Behrman Heights," is a crime-ridden low income community located in Algiers, New Orleans It was named after popular New Orleans mayor Martin Behrman, and is nestled south of the US Naval Support neighborhood and north of Tall Timbers/Brechtel, flanked on the west by Fischer Housing Development and Whitney, and on the east by Old Aurora.

History
The Behrman neighborhood was named after the longest-serving mayor of New Orleans, elected for five straight terms, from 1902-1920. Before his death in 1925, one year into his fifth term, Behrman made "considerable improvements in city services and facilities, including sewer and water systems, drainage, streets, the port, and public schools and public health facilities. It was during Behrman's tenure that the Public Belt Railroad was developed, the 1912 City Charter changed the city council to the commission form, and Storyville closed. "Martin Behrman's parents brought him to New Orleans when he was an infant. He lived most of his life in Algiers. He first entered politics as a ward worker for the Regular Democratic Organization in the 1888 Francis T. Nichols campaign for governor. He held a number of minor elective and appointive offices before becoming a political leader of the 15th ward, Algiers and finally mayor of the city of New Orleans. In 1938 Behrman Stadium opened and was the first playing facility serving Algiers. In the late 1960s, Behrman was diverse with whites and blacks living together until public housing was built, which resulted in the influx of African Americans. By 1975 the community was 75% African American. In the 1980s the crime rate raised major concerns for residents urging some to organize a Neighborhood Watch groups.
By the 2000s crimes deceased but homicides and shootings still remained a problem for curtain spots as well as vacant lots which were cleaned up in efforts to keep clean streets.

Demographics
The neighborhood is predominantly African American, with 90.4% of residents identifying as such in the 2000 Census.

Crime
The neighborhood has long suffered from a high-crime rates along with poverty due to the high amount of blighted properties. Most of the violence in which ran rampantly around vacant homes and in the Christopher Homes and in the notorious DeGaulle Manor apartments. These dilapidated housing complexes were located in the middle of the neighborhood and were closed and demolished due to vacancy problems. 
In 1990 residents of Behrman Heights began to organize neighborhood watch groups stating that they are "fed up with crime," after numerous shootings, robberies and auto thefts. The anti-crime block parties were meant to help decrease crime but made little effect.

The overall crime rate in Behrman is 141% higher than the national average. For every 100,000 people, there are 19.52 daily crimes that occur in Behrman. Behrman is safer than 16% of the cities in the Louisiana. In Behrman you have a 1 in 15 chance of becoming a victim of any crime. The number of total year over year crimes in New Orleans has increased by 12%. Berhman also ranks sixth in annual gun violence.

Housing
The median home price in Behrman is 38% lower than the national average. The median rent asked in Behrman is 1% higher than the national average.
The average number of people per household is 13% higher than the national average. The number of owner occupied households in Behrman is 25% lower than the national average. The number of renter occupied households in Behrman is 45% higher than the national average.

Public Housing

Section 8 housing complexes in Behrman were mostly filled with low income residents who lived in DeGaulle Manor and Christopher Park Homes. The two complexes were located on Murl and Vespasian Boulevard and mainly housed poor African-American families. HANO and HUD began to demolish the projects in the 1990s.

Education
The community is zoned to New Orleans Public Schools (NOPS) and the Recovery School District (RSD) operates public schools and handles charter schools.

References

Neighborhoods in New Orleans